Zhang Baixi (Courtesy Yěqiū; Posthumous name: Wéndá (1847 — March 30, 1907) was a Chinese government official during the late Qing Dynasty who is known for initializing the education reform. He was considered to be the "father of university" in China. Both the Peking University and the Beijing Normal University respect him as a founder and president.

Zhang Baixi was born in Changsha County of Hunan province, where he studied in the top local school, Chengnan 城南书院, under Guo Songtao (1818-1891).  In 1874, he earned a Jinshi degree and was elevated to the Hanlin Academy. As high administrator for many years, Zhang Baixi advocated profound political, economical and educational reforms. Although he was a member of the reform group led by Kang Youwei in the Hundred Days Reform of 1898, his role was small enough that his career continued to develop after the reformers were suppressed. After the Boxer Rebellion, partly because there were few surviving officials of ability and experience, he became a close advisor to the Empress Dowager.

Zhang proposed to reopen the Imperial Capital University (京師大學堂, former Peking University) founded in 1898. He had several motivations. One was national pride, to show the world that China could have a world-class university even after the Boxer debacle. A second was to keep higher education under the control of the central government, not local or provincial governments or private universities. He succeeded in getting government funding for an expanded and more impressive campus in the heart of the capital and for a well-supported faculty. Among his priorities for the university was a bureau to translate Japanese books and a compilation bureau which would publish text books of modern knowledge. According to one later official, Zhang's contribution to the development of Peking University was second only to that of Cai Yuanpei. 

In 1902, Zhang drafted the "Authorized School Regulation" (《欽定學堂章程》, alternatively called Renyin Educational system), "renyin" being the year 1902, which was put into effect by Qing government. In 1904, Zhang participated in the establishment of the "Presented School Regulation" (《奏定學堂章程》, also called "Guimao Educational System"), "guimao" being the year 1904, which was the first modern Chinese educational system.

Zhang died in Beijing in 1907.

Notes

References and further reading
 Xiaoqing Diana Lin. (SUNY series in Chinese Philosophy and Culture) Peking University, Chinese Scholarship and Intellectuals, 1898-1937. ; 
 

1847 births
1907 deaths
Politicians from Changsha
Qing dynasty politicians from Hunan
Educators from Hunan
Presidents of Beijing Normal University